John B. Polanski (September 6, 1918 – March 11, 1956) as an American football player.  He played college football for the Wake Forest Demon Deacons football team. He led all players in the NCAA major colleges with 882 rushing yards during the 1939 season. He also led the Southern Conference in scoring with 91 points in 1939. He also scored 96 points for Wake Forest in 1941.  In August 1942, he signed with the Detroit Lions.  He appeared in three games for the Lions in 1942, but his professional football career was cut short when he was ordered in early October 1942 to report to the Naval Training School at South Bend, Indiana. After being released from the military, Polanski played for the Los Angeles Dons in 1946. He died of a blood disease in 1956 at age 37 at the University of Michigan Hospital.

See also
 List of college football yearly rushing leaders

References

1918 births
1956 deaths
American football fullbacks
Wake Forest Demon Deacons football players
Detroit Lions players
Los Angeles Dons players
Players of American football from Buffalo, New York
American people of Polish descent